Ross Ingram "Lefty" Wilson (October 15, 1919 – November 4, 2002) was a Canadian ice hockey player. He served as an emergency goaltender on three separate occasions between 1953 and 1957, playing one game with each of the Detroit Red Wings, Toronto Maple Leafs, and Boston Bruins.

Biography
Wilson was a trainer for the Detroit Red Wings of the National Hockey League from 1950–1982. He won four Stanley Cup championships with Detroit in 1950, 1952, 1954 and 1955. He was one of the early pioneers of the goaltender's protective face mask, making the iconic mask that Terry Sawchuck wore, among the many others that he made for pro and top amateur goaltenders.

Wilson, who played goal in the Junior A, AHL and senior leagues, served as an emergency back-up goaltender for the Red Wings as well as for visiting teams, as was customary with many NHL trainers in the days before regular back-up goaltenders were carried on NHL team rosters. He played three total games in his career as the emergency goaltender. On October 10, 1953 he suited up for the Red Wings in relief for an injured Terry Sawchuk in a losing effort playing a total of 16 minutes for the Red Wings. On January 22, 1956 he suited up for the Toronto Maple Leafs replacing an injured Harry Lumley in another losing effort playing a total of 13 minutes and stopping nine shots for the Maple Leafs. On December 29, 1957 he suited up for the Boston Bruins replacing an injured Don Simmons in a game that ended in a 2-2 tie playing a total of 52 minutes allowing a goal and making 23 saves for the Bruins.

Career statistics

Regular season and playoffs

External links
 

1919 births
2002 deaths
Boston Bruins players
Canadian expatriate ice hockey people in the United States
Canadian ice hockey goaltenders
Detroit Red Wings players
Indianapolis Capitals players
Omaha Knights (USHL) players
Ice hockey people from Toronto
St. Paul Saints (USHL) players
Stanley Cup champions
Toronto Maple Leafs players
Toronto Maple Leafs coaches
Canadian ice hockey coaches